The Czech National Revival was a cultural movement which took place in the Czech lands during the 18th and 19th centuries. The purpose of this movement was to revive the Czech language, culture and national identity. The most prominent figures of the revival movement were Josef Dobrovský and Josef Jungmann.

Background

Following the Battle of White Mountain in 1620, Czech lands experienced Germanisation politics spearheaded by the Habsburg Emperors.

The oppression was also connected with religion – up to 95% of the inhabitants of Bohemia were Protestants (See Hussite) when the Habsburgs took power. Although the Habsburgs had promised freedom of religion, they started rampant anti-Reformation and re-Catholicization efforts which made most of the Czech elites flee the country. This violent re-Catholicization has been suggested to be one of the reasons behind today's widespread Czech atheism.

During the two following centuries Czech had been more or less eradicated from state administration, literature, schools, Charles University and among the upper classes. Large numbers of books written in Czech were burned for confessional reasons – for example, Jesuit Antonín Koniáš alone is credited with burning as many as 30,000 Czech-language books. Gradually, Czech was reduced to a means of communication between peasants, who were often illiterate. Therefore, the Revival looked for inspiration among ordinary Czechs in the countryside.

Milestones
Josef Dobrovský published his Czech grammar book in 1809. In 1817, Václav Hanka claimed to have discovered medieval Manuscripts of Dvůr Králové and Zelená Hora, which were decades later proven as Hanka's and Linda's forgeries.

Josef Jungmann published the five-volume Czech-German dictionary in 1834–1839. It was a major lexicographical work, which had a great formative influence on Czech. Jungmann used vocabulary of the Bible of Kralice (1579–1613) period and of the language used by his contemporaries. He borrowed words not present in Czech from other Slavic languages or created neologisms. He also inspired development of Czech scientific terminology, thus making it possible for original Czech research to develop.

This work was published by the Matice česká, an institution created by František Palacký in 1831 as a branch of the National Museum. The Matice became an important institution as it was at the time one of the few routes through which works in Czech could be published. In 1832 it took over the publication of the journal of the Bohemian Museum. This journal was important as it provided a forum for the Czech intelligentsia to publish their ideas in their own language, in contrast to the journal published by the Royal Bohemian Academy of Sciences, which was published in German.

With the renaissance of language, Czech culture flourished. Czech institutions were established to celebrate Czech history and culture. The National Theatre opened in 1883 and the National Museum in 1818.

Literature of the Revival
At the beginning of the Revival, written works focused more on developing the language and culture. Artistic works became more common towards the later phase of the Revival and it is in this period that some of the defining works of Czech Literature appeared.

Possibly as a consequence of the domination of urban society by the German-speaking population at the start of the century, Czech writers of the period often looked to the countryside for inspiration. In a similar fashion to how the Brothers Grimm recorded German folklore, Karel Jaromír Erben wrote Prostonárodní české písně a říkadla (Czech Folk Songs and Nursery Rhymes) which brought together various folktales. The countryside was looked to as the true Bohemia, where Czech folklore and traditions had survived away from the foreign influences of the cities. This can be seen in the work of Božena Němcová, whose novel The Grandmother explores life in a rural East Bohemian village.

Results
Czech became the language of the elites, literature, and after the creation of Czechoslovakia also the internal language of bureaucracy. Today Czech serves as the official language of the Czech Republic; however, due to the Revivalists' reverence for the outdated language of the Kralice Bible, which they used as a model for their grammar and dictionaries, a gap emerged between the everyday, colloquial language, and the learned language of literature, which to a lesser extent still exists.

See also
Czech chemical nomenclature

Institutions created by the Revival
 Czech National Museum
 National Theatre, Prague
 Matice česká

References

Czech literature
Czech nationalism